Egbertus Jacobus Waller (10 December 1901 – 23 October 1982 ) was a Dutch rower. He competed at the 1924 and 1928 Summer Olympics in the men's eight and coxless four, respectively, but failed to reach the finals.

References

1901 births
1982 deaths
Dutch male rowers
Olympic rowers of the Netherlands
Rowers at the 1924 Summer Olympics
Rowers at the 1928 Summer Olympics
Sportspeople from Delft
European Rowing Championships medalists